Venerable Sumangalo was a Buddhist monk ordained in both Theravada Buddhism and Mahayana Buddhism, and actively involved in Dhamma propagation works in both Singapore and Malaysia.

Biography
(1903—1963) was born as Robert Stuart Clifton in Birmingham, Alabama in the United States in 1903. After receiving his Doctorate in Literature, he lectured on Buddhism in the United States before moving to Asia to further his study of Buddhism. He was ordained as a priest during 1935 in a Jōdo Shinshū temple in Japan. After a few months of studies he returned to the USA where for the next 18 years he had no connection with this Buddhist order. In 1952 he requested for a letter of authority from Nishi-Honganji to found a “Western Buddhist Order.” This request was denied.

In 1957, he re-ordained into the Theravada Order in Laos and received the monastic name "Sumangalo", meaning "very auspicious". He then left for Malaya and later visited Singapore on a Dharma tour in late 1959 with another American Buddhist monk, Venerable Susiddhi. Through his efforts, a number of Youth Circles and Sunday schools were set up locally.

Pioneering Buddhist Youth Movement in Malaya
Venerable Sumangalo, who is well known as the Father of Malaysian Buddhist Youth Movement. He urged the establish of the Federation of Malaya Buddhist Youth Fellowship (FMBYF) on 24 December 1958 which was the first national Buddhist youth organization in the Peninsular Malaya then with the objective to unite the Buddhist youth in the new born nation. The Young Buddhist Association of Malaysia (YBAM) set up the Sumangalo Award in 1995 to commemorate Venerable Sumangalo for his great compassion, contributions and pioneering spirit in the Buddhist youth movement in Malaysia.

Abbotship in Singapore
In January 1959 he was offered the honorary abbotship of Poh Ern Shih Temple, thus becoming the first Westerner to be the abbot of a Buddhist temple in Singapore. While in Singapore, he assisted Pitt Chin Hui in her translation of the Ksitigarbha Bodhisattva Sutra from Chinese to English. He returned to Malaya and spent his later years at Penang Buddhist Association, where most of his Dharma lectures were held. His lectures were later compiled in English and Chinese and are still freely distributed. Venerable Sumangalo died on 6 February 1963 and was cremated in Penang.

References

American Buddhist monks
1903 births
1963 deaths
20th-century Buddhist monks